Arianthe Galani  (born 9 April 1940), is an Australian character actress born in New Zealand of Greek descent. She is known for her roles in TV soap operas and serials, TV commercials, as well as films. Galani is primarily known for guest roles and cameos.

Career
Galani worked in opera and sang professionally before she became known as an actor. She worked as a singer in England for four years in the 1960s then joined the Australian Opera for five years between 1967 and 1972.

Galani played a regular role in soap opera, Number 96 as Maria Panucci, the aunt of Harry Michaels' character Giovanni from late 1976 until the end of the series in August 1977, and then took a regular role in Australian Broadcasting Corporation situation comedy series Home Sweet Home (1980). Both roles were as fiery Italians.

Between these roles she made appearances in the first season of cult TV series Prisoner as Mrs. Bentley, a woman who had buried a baby alive, a crime later blamed on Lynn Warner (Kerry Armstrong, whom was wrongly incarcerated and continued to protest her innocence. Though her appearances were brief, the character played a crucial role in one of the show's original storylines, and with the program's international success is probably Galani's most widely seen portrayal.

Other television credits include: Matlock Police, Homicide, The Young Doctors, A Country Practice, The Flying Doctors, Home and Away, Police Rescue, Murder Call, Something in the Air, All Saints and Blue Heelers.

TV adverts
Galani also features in a series of television adverts for Jalna Greek Yoghurt and Mortein.

Filmography

References

External links
 

New Zealand television actresses
Australian television actresses
Living people
New Zealand people of Greek descent
Greek emigrants to Australia
1940 births